Propiolaldehyde is an organic compound with molecular formula HC2CHO. It is the simplest chemical compound containing both alkyne and aldehyde functional groups.  It is a colorless liquid with explosive properties.

Reactions
The compound exhibits reactions expected for an electrophilic alkynyl aldehyde.  It is a dienophile and a good Michael acceptor.  Grignard reagents add to the carbonyl center.  Its explosive properties are attributed to the exothermicity of its polymerization.

Preparation
Its acetal can be prepared from acrolein.

Occurrence in interstellar medium
Propynal has been observed in the interstellar medium. It is hypothesized to be formed from a carbon monoxide-acetylene complex.  Another possible pathway is through the reaction of propynylidyne (C3H) with water.

Hazards
The compound is explosive, possibly because it tends to polymerize.

See also
 Acrolein
 Propiolic acid

References

Aldehydes
Alkyne derivatives